Matt McCullough (born 9 September 1981) is a retired Irish rugby union footballer. He played for Ulster.

McCullough was educated at Ballymena Academy and Trinity College Dublin. He captained the School's 1st XV rugby team 1999–2000, which reached the final of the 2000 Ulster Schools , where they were beaten by RBAI.

He received 4 caps for Ireland in 2005.

He received 133 caps for Ulster between 2001 and 2009.

References

External links
 Profile on ESPNscrum.com

1981 births
Living people
Ulster Rugby players
Ballymena R.F.C. players
Dublin University Football Club players
Irish rugby union players
Ireland international rugby union players